The Barbarossa Cycleway is an 88 kilometre (55 mile) long cycle path in Germany, that links the North Palatine Uplands to the old imperial city of Worms on the River Rhine. It passes through the largely level, but varied landscape of the Palatinate region, before it reaches the vineyards of the Rhine Plain. It thus links the Glan-Blies Cycleway via the Barbarossa city of Kaiserslautern with the Rhine Cycleway. The whole route is uniformly signed with the cycleway logo which portrays a stylised Emperor Barbarossa. The figure of Emperor Frederick Barbarossa at the north portal of Worms Cathedral was used as the prototype.
Several sections have been left natural, so the cycleway is not suitable for racing bicycles or inline skaters.

External links 

 Barbarossa Cycleway at radreisen.wiki
 Barbarossa Cycleway with map GPS-track and tourist information

Sources 
 Radwanderland.de retrieved November 2011

Worms, Germany
Palatinate (region)
Cycleways in Germany
Transport in Rhineland-Palatinate
Frederick I, Holy Roman Emperor